The Superibérica de Rugby was a national rugby union competition in Spain which was held in 2009 with six Spanish teams, with the hope of expanding to include Portuguese teams and a team from Gibraltar in the future.  

Gatos de Madrid won the only season in 2009.

In January 2010 it was announced that the second Superliga season will take place in August, September and early October 2010. Eight teams (no mention to Portuguese or Gibraltarian teams) were expected to participate, however the competition was discontinued.

Teams
•Gatos
•Korsarioak
•Vacceos Cavaliers
• Blaus-Almogàvers
• Sevilla F.C.
• Mariners

2009 season

*Winner for Tries(Gatos 2, Mariners 1)

References

External links
 Article from Spanish sports newspaper AS

1